JPods is a personal rapid transit concept which uses distributed collaborative computer networks to route transit in a manner similar to the data trafficking of the Internet. Developed by JPods LLC, the vehicles consist of ultra-light pods controlled by on-board computers.

Transport Characteristics 
In the demonstration JPod, people get in, select a destination on a touch screen and the vehicle navigates to that address.  In production models people and/or cargo will set destination and travel non-stop from origin to destination.

System details 
 vehicles travel suspended below an overhead guideway that encases the bogies
 bogies are the mechanisms that propel vehicles and from which the vehicle chassis is suspended. Bogies are composed of generally of motors, controllers, wheels, gearboxes, sensors, and switches.
 switch control is managed by the vehicle and/or by the network
 solar powered
 travel between 

The computer network is managed in three tiers:
 devices such as pods, switches, structures
 negotiators collaborate with devices and load managers to set routes
 load managers log time-based demand to create a terrain map that allows appropriate routes to be identified and scheduled

References

External links 
 JPods.com

Personal rapid transit